Roger Moult (born 1 May 1963) is a South African cricketer. He played in nine first-class matches from 1980/81 to 1989/90.

References

External links
 

1963 births
Living people
South African cricketers
Border cricketers
Griqualand West cricketers
Cricketers from Kimberley, Northern Cape